The 19th BET Awards were held on June 23, 2019 at Microsoft Theater in Los Angeles, California. The ceremony celebrated achievements in entertainment and honors music, sports, television, and movies. Cardi B received the most nominations with seven, and won the most awards with two, including for Album of the Year.

On May 29, 2019, it was announced that the ceremony would be hosted for the first time by actress Regina Hall.

On June 13, 2019, it was announced that special awards would be presented to Mary J. Blige, who received the 2019 Lifetime Achievement Award; Tyler Perry, who was given the Ultimate Icon Award; and Nipsey Hussle, who was posthumously honored with the Humanitarian Award.

Performers

Presenters
The first wave was announced on June 3, 2019. 
Yara Shahidi – presented Best New Artist
Irv Gotti, Justine Skye & Elijah Kelley – presented Young Stars Award
Regina Hall – introduced Fantasia
Raphael Saadiq – introduced Lucky Daye
Anderson .Paak – presented Album of the Year
Amanda Seales – presented Shine a Light to Candice Payne
Rev. Al Sharpton – presented Dr. Bobby Jones Gospel Inspirational Award
Larenz Tate & La La Anthony – presented Best Movie
Jodie Turner-Smith, Melina Matsoukas, and Lena Waithe – introduced world premiere trailer for Queen & Slim
Marsai Martin – presented Best Actress
Rihanna – presented Lifetime Achievement Award to Mary J. Blige
Ayesha Curry & Ne-Yo – presented Best International Act
Jacob Latimore – presented Coca-Cola Viewer's Choice Award
Taraji P. Henson – presented Ultimate Icon Award to Tyler Perry
Morris Chestnut & Damson Idris – Eulogy for John Singleton
T.I. – presented Humanitarian Award to the family of Nipsey Hussle

Nominations
Winners highlighted in Bold.

Special Awards
Lifetime Achievement Award: Mary J. Blige

Humanitarian Award: Nipsey Hussle

Ultimate Icon Award: Tyler Perry

Records Set
Bruno Mars became the first person to win Best Male R&B/Pop Artist three years in a row.
Migos became the first group or duo to win Best Group three years in a row. 
Serena Williams won Sportswoman of the Year for the 12th time; the sixth year in a row.
Beyoncé won Best Female R&B/Pop Artist for the 10th time; the sixth year in a row.

References

External links

BET Awards
2019 music awards
2019 awards
2019 awards in the United States